Bravvion Roy (born October 18, 1996) is an American football defensive tackle for the Carolina Panthers of the National Football League (NFL). He played college football at Baylor, and was drafted by the Panthers in the sixth round of the 2020 NFL Draft.

College career
As a senior, Roy made 61 tackles including 13 tackles-for-loss, 5.5 sacks, one forced fumble, seven QB hurries, and one blocked kick. He was named to the first-team All-Big 12. Against Kansas State, Roy tallied a career-high 3.5 tackles-for-loss and a half sack. In his career, he compiled 133 career tackles, 7.5 sacks, and 19 tackles for loss.

Professional career
Roy was selected by the Carolina Panthers with the 184th overall pick in the sixth round of the 2020 NFL Draft. Roy was reunited with Carolina Panthers' head coach Matt Rhule, who was also his head coach at Baylor.

In Week 12 against the Minnesota Vikings, Roy recorded his first career sack on Kirk Cousins during the 28–27 loss.

On September 20, 2022, Roy was placed on injured reserve after suffering a hamstring injury in Week 2. He was activated on October 22.

On November 20, 2022, Roy recorded his first career interception against Lamar Jackson and the Baltimore Ravens.

References

External links
Carolina Panthers bio
Baylor Bears bio

1996 births
Living people
American football defensive tackles
Baylor Bears football players
Carolina Panthers players
People from Spring, Texas
Players of American football from Texas
Sportspeople from Harris County, Texas